Roman Vopat (born April 21, 1976) is a Czech former professional ice hockey player. He played four seasons in the National Hockey League (NHL) for the St. Louis Blues, Los Angeles Kings, Chicago Blackhawks, and Philadelphia Flyers. He is the younger brother of former NHL defenceman, Jan Vopat.

Playing career
He was drafted by the St. Louis Blues as their seventh-round draft pick, #172 overall, in the 1994 NHL Entry Draft.

Vopat started his playing career in his native Litvínov, before spending a season in the Western Hockey League with the Moose Jaw Warriors, joining the Blues' IHL affiliate the Peoria Rivermen for their playoff run during the 1994–95 season.  He then joined the St. Louis organization the next season but was sent back to Moose Jaw for further development, he later moved to the Prince Albert Raiders.

On February 27, 1996, Vopat, along with Craig Johnson, Patrice Tardif and two draft picks were traded from the St. Louis Blues to the Los Angeles Kings for Wayne Gretzky.  After three seasons in LA, he was traded to the Colorado Avalanche for Eric Lacroix, but never played a game for the Avalanche as he was then traded to the Chicago Blackhawks less than a month later.  After three games with Chicago he was traded once more to the Philadelphia Flyers for Mike Maneluk.

At the start of the 1999–2000, Vopat was sent to the Flyers' AHL affiliate, the Philadelphia Phantoms, which marked the end of his NHL career. After just 12 games, he spent the rest of the season with the Essen Mosquitoes of the Deutsche Eishockey Liga in Germany.  Vopat then played five seasons in Finland's SM-liiga, for Pelicans, Ilves, and HIFK. In 2005, he returned to the Czech Republic with HC Sparta Praha but then returned to Finland, this time signing a contract with Jokerit, HIFK's local archrival.  In 2006, he moved to Sweden and signed with Leksands who play in the country second tier league.

Career statistics

Regular season and playoffs

International

External links
 

1976 births
Chicago Blackhawks players
Czech ice hockey centres
Essen Mosquitoes players
Fredericton Canadiens players
HC Litvínov players
HC Sparta Praha players
HIFK (ice hockey) players
Ilves players
Jokerit players
Leksands IF players
Living people
Los Angeles Kings players
Moose Jaw Warriors players
Lahti Pelicans players
People from Litvínov
Peoria Rivermen (IHL) players
Philadelphia Flyers players
Philadelphia Phantoms players
Phoenix Roadrunners (IHL) players
Prince Albert Raiders players
St. Louis Blues draft picks
St. Louis Blues players
Worcester IceCats players
Sportspeople from the Ústí nad Labem Region
Czechoslovak ice hockey centres
Czech expatriate ice hockey players in Canada
Czech expatriate ice hockey players in the United States
Czech expatriate ice hockey players in Sweden
Czech expatriate ice hockey players in Finland
Czech expatriate ice hockey players in Germany
Czech expatriate sportspeople in Denmark
Expatriate ice hockey players in Denmark